The consensus 1938 College Basketball All-American team, as determined by aggregating the results of four major All-American teams.  To earn "consensus" status, a player must win honors from a majority of the following teams: the Helms Athletic Foundation, Converse, the Newspaper Enterprise Association (NEA), and Madison Square Garden.

1938 Consensus All-America team

Individual All-America teams

See also
 1937–38 NCAA men's basketball season

References

NCAA Men's Basketball All-Americans
All-Americans